The men's 4 × 100 metres relay at the 2021 World Athletics Relays has been held at the Silesian Stadium on 1 and 2 May.

Only 18 teams participated of 24 possible qualifiers, with the USA (CR), Jamaica (WR), Canada, Great Britain, Trinidad and Tobago, and China (WL) not entering.
On the 19 teams qualified by entry standard (38.80), Thailand and Chinese Taipei also declined to participate, same as Australia, first of the following top list. The 10 best placed teams will qualify for the 2022 World Championships in Eugene.

5 nations which made the men’s 4x100m final at the 2019 IAAF World Athletics Championships in Doha are entered – Brazil, France, Japan, the Netherlands and South Africa – their qualification for Tokyo is also already secured. The 8 finalist teams will join them if different ones.

Records
Prior to the competition, the records were as follows:

Program 
Heats : Saturday 1 May 2021, 20:39 (weather: 11 °C).
Final:	Sunday 2 May 2021, 19:35 (weather: 7 °C).

Preview

According to World Athletics, there were 2 teams who were possible favorite winners:
 Brazil: Paulo André de Oliveira returns to World Relays and he is again joined by his 2019 teammates Rodrigo do Nascimento and Derick Silva. That trio was also part of the quartet which finished fourth at the 2019 IAAF World Championships in Doha, clocking 37.72 (AR), along with Felipe dos Santos.
 South Africa: Akani Simbine, who has already been under 10 seconds 3 times this season. He, Thando Dlodlo, Simon Magakwe and Clarence Munyai combined to clock an African record of 37.65 (AR) in the Doha heats, going on to finish 5th in the final, with Dlodlo and Munyai joining Simbine among South Africa’s team entries, along with Gift Leotlela.

There are 6 possible runners-up for the final:
France: 37.88, features 2016 Olympic 200m bronze medallist Christophe Lemaitre (not in the heats), who helped his nation to bronze at the London 2012 Games, along with Amaury Golitin, Mouhamadou Fall and Méba-Mickaël Zeze.
The Netherlands: 37.91 (NR). The Dutch entries include Doha team members Joris van Gool, Taymir Burnet, Hensley Paulina and Churandy Martina, along with Chris Garia.
Japan: 37.43 (AR), home Olympics, and following silver at the Rio Games and world bronze in Doha, Japan is fielding a largely developmental squad including Ryuichiro Sakai (1st leg), Ryota Suzuki (2nd), Daisuke Miyamoto (3rd) and Hiroki Yanagita (Final leg).
Italy: 38.11 (NR) while European indoor 60m champion Marcell Jacobs has been named on the Italian team along with national 100m record-holder Filippo Tortu, along with Fausto Desalu and Davide Manenti.
Germany: 38.24 with Julian Reus, who formed part of European medal-winning teams from 2012-2016, is in the German squad.
Ghana: 38.24 with Benjamin Azamati-Kwaku.

6 more teams to complete the 10 World Championships qualifiers:
Czech Republic: 38.62 (NR) with Zdeněk Stromšík, Jan Veleba, Jan Jirka and Dominik Záleský.
Turkey: 38.47 while 2017 world 200m champion Ramil Guliyev is among the team entries, with former Jamaicans Jak Ali Harvey and Emre Zafer Barnes.
NGR 38.59 with Divine Oduduru (renounced to participate for visa reasons). 
UKR: 38.84 with Emil Ibrahimov, Erik Kostrytsya, Stanislav Kovalenko and Serhiy Smelyk.
ZIM: 38.95 (NR) with Ngoni Makusha.
POL: 39.20. The host nation squad features Adrian Brzeziński (3rd leg), Dominik Kopeć (2nd), Karol Kwiatkowski, Rafał Pająk, Mateusz Siuda (1st), Przemysław Słowikowski (Final leg) and Łukasz Żok.

Results

Heats 
Heats Qualification: First 2 of each heat (Q) plus the 2 fastest times (q) advanced to the final.

Final

References

4 x 100 metres relay
4 × 100 metres relay